Digras (दिग्रस) Vidhan Sabha seat is one of the 288 constituencies of Maharashtra Vidhan Sabha and one of the seven which are located in the Yavatmal district.

It is a segment of the Yavatmal-Washim (Lok Sabha constituency) with adjoining Washim district along with five other Vidhan Sabha assembly constituencies, viz. Washim (SC), Karanja, Ralegaon (ST), Yavatmal (ST) and Pusad.

Members of Vidhan Sabha

Election Results

2004 Vidhan Sabha
 Deshmukh Sanjay Uttamrao (Ind) : 42,991 votes  
 Shreekant Alias Balasaheb (SHS) : 40,473

1995 Vidhan Sabha
 Munginwar, Shrikant Wamanrao (SHS) : 43,392 votes 
 Rathod Pratap Lalsing (JD) : 31,875

See also
Digras
Darwha

Notes

Assembly constituencies of Maharashtra